The Assembly of Canonical Orthodox Bishops of the United States of America (formerly the Episcopal Assembly of North and Central America and later the Assembly of Canonical Orthodox Bishops of North and Central America) is an organization of church hierarchs of Eastern Orthodox Churches in United States.

Overview 
The assembly began when delegates from the 14 autocephalous Eastern Orthodox churches met at the Center of the Ecumenical Patriarchate in Chambésy, Switzerland, on June 6–12, 2009. At that time, the conference decided to sanction the establishment of episcopal assemblies in 12 regions of the so-called Eastern Orthodox diaspora which are beyond the boundaries of the autocephalous churches. Such assemblies have the authority to propose future administrative structures for the Church in their respective regions.

The first conference of the Episcopal Assembly of North and Central America was held at the Helmsley Park Lane Hotel in New York on May 27–28, 2010 under the chairmanship of Archbishop Demetrios of America.

One of the major decisions reached at the Episcopal Assembly's first meeting was the dissolution of the Standing Conference of the Canonical Orthodox Bishops in the Americas, and to assume all of SCOBA's functions, agencies and ministries.

Other issues discussed included requests to partition the present region of the Episcopal Assembly of North and Central America into two distinct regions of the United States and Canada, as well as to merge Mexico and Central America with the Episcopal Assembly of South America.  As a result, some of the bishops of Mexico and Central America do not attend the North American Assembly, anticipating their joining with the South American Assembly.

Although autonomy is an issue for North and Central American churches, there was no direct statement from the assembly regarding autonomy for the Church in North or Central America.

Shortly after the May 2010 meeting the name of the assembly was changed to Assembly of Canonical Orthodox Bishops of North and Central America to avoid possible confusion with the Episcopal Church of the United States.

In April 2014, the Canadian and US bishops decided to form separate assemblies in order to best respond to the cultural diversity and pastoral needs in the region. The assembly was renamed to Assembly of Canonical Orthodox Bishops of the United States of America. The Canadian bishops formed the Assembly of Canonical Orthodox Bishops of Canada and the Central American bishops joined the Assembly of Canonical Orthodox Bishops of Latin America.

Members of the Assembly 
These jurisdictions' bishops are members of the Assembly, according to diptych order:
Ecumenical Patriarchate
Greek Orthodox Archdiocese of America
Ukrainian Orthodox Church of the USA
Ukrainian Orthodox Church of Canada
Albanian Orthodox Diocese of America
American Carpatho-Russian Orthodox Diocese
Antiochian Orthodox Christian Archdiocese of North America

Serbian Orthodox Church in the USA and Canada
Romanian Orthodox Metropolis of the Americas
Bulgarian Eastern Orthodox Diocese of the USA, Canada and Australia

Georgian Apostolic Orthodox Church in North America
Orthodox Church in America

As of 14 September 2018, the Moscow Patriarchate and the churches belonging to them are not participating in the Assembly as part of the 2018 Moscow–Constantinople schism.

Meetings of the Assembly of Bishops 
Assemblies are held annually. Members may abstain due to extraneous circumstances including illness, or distance. Many members live outside the United States and some outside of North America. Some jurisdictions in Central America do not participate in these Assemblies, as the Assembly of Bishops in North America and the Assembly in South America have petitioned to join Central America to the South American Assembly. Members from Canada also may not attend as this Assembly and their Bishops have applied to create a separate Assembly for Canada.

Attendees of the Inaugural Assembly (2010) 
Fifty-five of the sixty-six hierarchs in the region were present at the founding assembly in 2010:

 Archbishop Demetrios (Trakatellis) of America, Chairman
 Metropolitan Philip (Saliba) of New York, Vice Chairman
 Archbishop Justinian (Ovchinnikov) of Naro-Fominsk, Vice Chairman
 Bishop Basil (Essey) of Wichita, Secretary
 Archbishop Anthony (Scherba) of Hierapolis, Treasurer
 Metropolitan Iakovos (Garmatis) of Chicago
 Metropolitan Athenagoras (Aneste) of Mexico
 Metropolitan Methodios (Tournas) of Boston
 Metropolitan Isaiah (Chronopoulos) of Denver
 Metropolitan Alexios (Panagiotopoulos) of Atlanta
 Metropolitan Nikitas (Lulias) of Dardanellia
 Metropolitan Nicholas (Pissare) of Detroit
 Metropolitan Gerasimos (Michaleas) of San Francisco
 Metropolitan Evangelos (Kourounis) of New Jersey
 Metropolitan Paisios (Loulourgas) of Tyana
 Archbishop Yurij (Kalistchuk) of Toronto
 Bishop Christophoros (Rakintzakis) of Andida
 Bishop Vikentios (Malamatenios) of Apameia
 Bishop Savas (Zembillas) of Troas
 Bishop  Andonios (Paropoulos) of Phasiane
 Bishop Ilia (Katre) of Philomelion
 Bishop Hiarion (Rudnyk) of Edmonton
 Bishop Andriy (Peshko) of York
 Bishop Demetrios (Kantzavelos) of Mokissos
 Bishop Daniel (Zelinskyy) of Pamphilon
 Bishop Antoun (Khouri) of Miami
 Bishop Joseph (Al-Zehlaoui) of Los Angeles
 Bishop Thomas (Joseph) of Charleston and Oakland
 Bishop Mark (Maymon) of Toledo
 Bishop Alexander (Mufarrij) of Ottawa
 Metropolitan Hilarion (Kapral) of New York
 Bishop Job (Smakouz) of Kashira
 Bishop Gabriel (Chemodakov) of Montreal
 Bishop Peter (Loukianoff) of Cleveland
 Bishop Theodosius (Ivashchenko) of Seattle
 Bishop George (Schaefer) of Mayfield
 Bishop Jerome (Shaw) of Manhattan
 Metropolitan Christopher (Kovacevich) of Midwestern America
 Bishop Maxim (Vasilijevic) of Western America
 Archbishop Nicolae (Condrea) of Chicago
 Bishop Ioan Casian (Tunaru) of Vicina
 Metropolitan Joseph (Bosakov) of America and Australia
 Metropolitan Jonah (Paffhausen) of Washington
 Archbishop Nathaniel (Popp) of Detroit
 Archbishop Seraphim (Storheim) of Ottawa
 Bishop Nikon (Liolin) of Boston
 Bishop Tikhon (Mollard) of Philadelphia
 Bishop Benjamin (Peterson) of San Francisco
 Bishop Melchisedek (Pleska) of Pittsburgh
 Bishop Alejo (Pacheco y Vera) of Mexico City
 Bishop Irineu (Duvlea) of Dearborn Heights
 Bishop Irénée (Rochon) of Quebec City
 Bishop Michael (Dahulich) of New York

See also 

 List of Eastern Orthodox jurisdictions in North America
 List of American and Canadian Orthodox bishops
 History of the Eastern Orthodox Church in North America
 Assembly of Canonical Orthodox Bishops of the United States of America
 Greek Orthodox Patriarchate of Antioch
 Antiochian Greek Christians
 Philip (Saliba)
 Antiochian Orthodox Christian Archdiocese of North America

References

External links 
 Assembly of Canonical Orthodox Bishops of the United States of America (official website)
 Episcopal Assembly of North and Central America on OrthodoxWiki
 Official website of SCOBA

 Statement to the Faithful On Church Attendance and Best Practices during the COVID-19 (Coronavirus) Pandemic

Eastern Orthodox Church bodies in North America